The University of Applied Science and Technology (UAST) is a public university in Iran administrated by the Ministry of Science, Research and Technology. It was established in 1992 and has 1500 education centers in various Provinces of Iran.
This university helps to increase skill level of employed personnel in various sectors of economic field and graduates of higher education and professional skills that are lacking in administrative. It is inspired by Community colleges in the United States.

The University of Applied Science and Technology (UAST) is a type of higher education institution that focuses on providing students with practical, hands-on training in a specific field or industry. These universities typically offer programs in technical or vocational fields, such as engineering, computer science, or business, and may also have a stronger emphasis on research and development. UASTs are generally considered to be more career-focused than traditional universities, which may place more emphasis on theoretical knowledge and the liberal arts.

See also

Higher education in Iran
List of universities in Iran

References

External links
Official website

App
Higher education in Iran